Loaf is the first live album release by the jam band moe. Recorded live at The Wetlands Preserve in New York City, New York on November 24 and 25 1995. 2,000 copies were released. It is out of print.

Track listing
"Moth" (Schnier) — 6:55
"Rebubula" (Derhak) — 13:13
"Al's Ticket Spiel" (Schnier) — 0:17
"32 Things" (Schnier) — 9:27
"Buster" (Derhak) — 9:40
"Newt Slander" (moe.) — 0:29
"Meat" (moe.) — 14:05
"Seat of My Pants" (Schnier) — 8:52

Personnel
moe.
Rob Derhak - bass, songwriter, vocals, producer
Chuck Garvey - guitar, songwriter, vocals, producer
Al Schnier - guitar, songwriter, vocals, producer
Mike Strazza - drums
Production:
Brendan O'Neil - engineer, mixing

External links
moe.'s website

Moe (band) live albums
1996 live albums